Corish is a surname. Men with that surname include:

 Bob Corish (born 1958), English footballer
 Brendan Corish (1918–1990), Irish politician
 Patrick Corish (1921-2013), Irish priest and writer
 Richard Corish (1889–1945), Irish politician
 Aidan Corish (Born 1960 Dublin), American politician, Sag Harbor NY

See also
Cornish (disambiguation)